Red Lion Hill (Welsh: Bryn Llew Goch) or Banc y Dolau is a hill in Powys, Wales, with a summit  above sea level.

At the beginning of the twentieth century the area immediately to the east of the hill was known as Red Lion Plantations, and just beyond that was a small hamlet called Red Lion. As of 2020 Red Lion consists of just a single dwelling, which Royal Mail considers to be part of nearby Llanbadarn Fynydd.

A building labelled Red Lion School is shown on the 1st edition Ordnance Survey Map at SO0681576817.

References

Mountains and hills of Powys